Yangjeong Station may refer to:
 Yangjeong Station (Busan), on Busan Metro Line 1, in Busan, Korea
 Yangjeong Station (Namyangju), on Jungang Line, in Namyangju, Gyeonggi-do, Korea
 Yangjeong Station (Sangju), on Gyeongbuk Line, in Sangju, Gyeongsangbuk-do, Korea